Neritan Novi (born 3 September 1970) is an Albanian football manager and former player.

International statistics

References

1970 births
Living people
People from Gjirokastër County
People from Gjirokastër
Footballers from Gjirokastër
Albanian footballers
Albania international footballers
Association football midfielders
Luftëtari Gjirokastër players
Kategoria Superiore players
Luftëtari Gjirokastër managers
Kategoria Superiore managers
Albanian football managers